Palmyra Township is the name of some places in the U.S. state of Pennsylvania:

Palmyra Township, Pike County, Pennsylvania
Palmyra Township, Wayne County, Pennsylvania

Pennsylvania township disambiguation pages